Longlevens, originally Longleavens, is a suburb of Gloucester, in the unparished area of Gloucester, in the Gloucester district, in the county of Gloucestershire, England. It developed from a farmstead during the twentieth century, the name may be based on the old Roman name Colonia Glevensis, or the name could be based on an original field name "Long Elevens". This could have related to a long field about eleven acres therefore this could have been adopted as a name for the hamlet, first recorded in 1750, as part of the estate of Gloucester Cathedral. One of the oldest roads is 'The Avenue', which is shown on old maps as a number of farm cottages. The population of Longlevens was 9,532 at the time of the 2011 Census.

History 
Wotton St. Mary (Without), save for a few acres given to Barnwood and Churchdown, was included with parts of Barnwood, Churchdown, and Hucclecote in the new civil parish of Longlevens, north-east of Gloucester. Parts of Longlevens were added to Gloucester in 1951 and in 1967 when the remainder was re-formed as Innsworth civil parish.

Orcharding, which was increased at Innsworth in the mid 19th century, remained an important feature and in 1896 covered at least 172 a. in the parishes of Gloucester, Longford, Tuffley, Twigworth, and Wotton St. Mary (Without). The demands of Gloucester's growing population in the 19th century increased market gardening in the hamlets and by 1843 J. C. Wheeler's nurseries included a large area between Kingsholm and Wotton. In 1851 market gardeners were fairly numerous in Longford and Twigworth, and later there were several market gardens and nurseries at Longlevens (called Springfield) and Innsworth.

Character and facilities
Longlevens is primarily residential, and is home to Sir Thomas Rich's School, Holy Trinity Church, Kendal Road Baptist Church, Longlevens Junior School, Longlevens Infants School and various shops, including a Co-op and Tesco Express, takeaways including the Balti Hut, Spicy Kalkata Club, Oxstalls Fryer and Ruddy's Fish and Chips along with local businesses including Farr & Farr Estate Agents, CMG Property Management.

Flooding
A small part of Longlevens was affected by the July 2007 floods; this caused Horsbere Brook, which skirts its Eastern edge to flood several homes and roads, particularly Greyhound Gardens and Cypress Gardens.

Football and greyhound racing 
Of clubs playing association football the most important was Gloucester City Association Football Club, originating in 1889 and re-formed in 1925. From 1935 it had its ground at Longlevens and in 1964 it moved to a new stadium in Horton Road, which was later also used for greyhound racing. A more important centre for greyhound racing was the Gloucester & Cheltenham Stadium which opened in 1933 and closed in 1983. Longlevens is also home to a thriving semi-professional team in Longlevens AFC who have a range of adult, women's, youth and junior teams playing at several locations in the area (Longford Lane, Innsworth Lane and Longlevens Infant School).

References

External links 

http://www.longlevens.org/
http://www.mylonglevens.co.uk/

Areas of Gloucester